Jeff Russo (born August 31) is an American composer, songwriter, guitarist, vocalist and music producer, and one of the two founding members of American rock band Tonic. He is also a founding member of acoustic rock band Low Stars.

Russo is also known for his work as composer on various films and television series, notably Snowfall, Fargo, Legion, and Counterpart, as well as the Star Trek series Star Trek: Discovery, Star Trek: Picard, and Star Trek: Strange New Worlds, and For All Mankind (TV series). He also scored the miniseries The Night Of and the acclaimed video game What Remains of Edith Finch. For his work on Fargo, he won the Primetime Emmy Award for Outstanding Music Composition for a Limited Series, Movie, or Special in 2017.

Biography
Russo began his music career as a rock musician. In 2012 he was invited (by his rock-band friends, Wendy & Lisa) to assist in creating the theme music for a planned TV series based on the popular movie Fargo, and he realized how much he enjoyed the process.
He currently scores two Peabody Award nominated shows: CBS’s Star Trek: Discovery and FX’s Legion, starring Dan Stevens and Aubrey Plaza. He also scores Netflix’s The Umbrella Academy starring Elliot Page, Robert Sheehan and Mary J. Blige, based on the popular comic book series by Gerard Way and Gabriel Ba. He wrote for Noah Hawley’s feature directorial debut from Fox Searchlight, Lucy in the Sky, starring Natalie Portman and Jon Hamm, and Altered Carbon, an adaptation of Richard K. Morgan’s sci-fi novel. His film work includes scoring Mark Wahlberg’s action-thriller film Mile 22, Craig Macneill’s Lizzie, starring Chloë Sevigny and Kristen Stewart, which premiered at the 2018 Sundance Film Festival, and Jon Avnet’s Three Christs, starring Richard Gere, which premiered at the 2017 Toronto International Film Festival.
 His first connection with the Star Trek franchise was his contribution to Star Trek: Discovery.

Russo and his wife, musician Nina Gordon, of the band Veruca Salt, have two children.

Albums

Tonic

Guest appearance

Low Stars

Solo

Soundtracks

Film

Television

Video game

References

External links
 Jeff Russo Web Site
 Jeff Russo myspace page
 
 

1969 births
20th-century American guitarists
American alternative rock musicians
American film score composers
American television composers
American rock guitarists
Living people
American male film score composers
Male television composers
Place of birth missing (living people)
Tonic (band) members